William Tenny was an American Negro league catcher between 1909 and 1912.

Tenny played for the Kansas City Giants from 1909 to 1911, and for the French Lick Plutos in 1912. In 47 recorded career games, he posted 59 hits in 203 plate appearances.

References

External links
Baseball statistics and player information from Baseball-Reference Black Baseball Stats and Seamheads

Year of birth missing
Year of death missing
Place of birth missing
Place of death missing
French Lick Plutos players
Kansas City Giants players
Baseball catchers